The Nieuport 21 (or Nieuport XXI C.1 in contemporary sources) was a French single-seat, single-engine fighter aircraft used during World War I. The aircraft was used by the French, Russian, British and American air forces. After the war, the Nieuport 21 was a popular civil aircraft.

Design and development
The Nieuport 21 was designed by Gustave Delage and it made its maiden flight in 1916. While it had a similar airframe to the Nieuport 17, it was equipped with a less powerful Le Rhône 9C engine as it was originally intended as a long range escort fighter. As the  engine was fitted with a horseshoe shaped cowling, the Nieuport 21 was often mistaken for the slightly smaller Nieuport 11, which used the same cowling.

Operational history

The Nieuport 21 served alongside the more powerful Nieuport 17, where its lower weight helped boost its already impressive climb rate. Although initially intended as a bomber escort, this role was abandoned when the bombers were withdrawn from daylight operations. Large numbers were also built for training duties. Nieuport 21s were sold to Russia, and to the United States for use as trainers. The Nieuport 21 was license manufactured in Russia by Dux Factory. Examples were also used in limited numbers by the Royal Naval Air Service. 
A small number were used by a number of air arms in the early post war period, including the Finnish Air Force (the Whites) which had captured a Russian aircraft in Tampere in 1918 and which was used until 1923. The French Navy used one example for carrier trials in 1919 and 1920. Due to its similarity to the Nieuport 11, many operated by air forces post-war have been misidentified in the past as Nieuport 11s, few of which survived that long.

Operators

Argentine Navy

Brazilian Air Force

Estonian Air Force - Postwar

Armee de l'Air
French Navy

Finnish Air Force
 Finnish Socialist Workers' Republic
Red Guards (ex-Russian examples)

Luchtvaartafdeling - operated 5 Nieuport 21s as 80 HP Nieuports.

Portuguese Air Force

Romanian Air Corps

Imperial Russian Air Service

Soviet Air Forces operated ex-Imperial Russian Air Service.

Royal Thai Air Force

Ukrainian People's Republic Air Fleet

Royal Naval Air Service
 Five aircraft only.

United States Army Air Service

Specifications

See also

References

Notes

Bibliography

 

1910s French fighter aircraft
 021
Sesquiplanes
Single-engined tractor aircraft
Rotary-engined aircraft
1910s French military trainer aircraft
Aircraft first flown in 1916